Nérée Boubée (1806 in Toulouse – 1862 in Luchon) was a naturalist, entomologist, geologist, author and a professor at the University of Paris. He was a Member of the Société entomologique de France.

In 1845, he established a natural history dealership and publishing house, the still very successful Maison d'édition Boubée.

External links
 Mineralogical Record Biological Archive

French entomologists
French geologists
1806 births
1862 deaths
Academic staff of the University of Paris